San Clemente is a municipality in Cuenca, Castile-La Mancha, Spain.

References

Municipalities in the Province of Cuenca